Sérgio Pereira Andrade (born 29 January 2001), known as Serginho, is a Portuguese professional footballer who plays as a winger for the Portuguese club Oliveirense on loan from Estoril.

Career
Serginho is a youth product of the academies of Belenenses, Sacavenense, and Benfica. Beginning his career with the Benfica U23s for the first half of the 2020-21 season, he moved to Estoril's that winter. He signed his first professional contract with Estoril on 19 July 2022, keeping him at the club until 2025.

Serginho made his professional and Primeira Liga debut as a late starter in a 2–2 tie with Rio Ave on 19 August 2022.

Personal life
Born in Portugal, Serginho is of Cape Verdean descent.

References

External links
 

2001 births
Living people
Footballers from Lisbon
Portuguese footballers
Portuguese sportspeople of Cape Verdean descent
Association football wingers
G.D. Estoril Praia players
U.D. Oliveirense players
Primeira Liga players
Liga Portugal 2 players